Hwang Yool-ja is a female former international table tennis player from South Korea.

Table tennis career
She won a silver medal at the 1959 World Table Tennis Championships, in the Corbillon Cup (women's team event) for South Korea with Cho Kyung-Cha, Choi Kyung-ja and Lee Chong-Hi.   She also made the women's doubles quarter final during the same championships.

She won two Asian Championship medals in 1962.

See also
 List of World Table Tennis Championships medalists

References

South Korean female table tennis players
Asian Games medalists in table tennis
Table tennis players at the 1962 Asian Games
Asian Games silver medalists for South Korea
Asian Games bronze medalists for South Korea
Medalists at the 1962 Asian Games
World Table Tennis Championships medalists
20th-century South Korean women